Olaso is a Basque surname. Notable people with the surname include:

 Guillermo Olaso (born 1988), Spanish tennis player
 Luis Olaso (1900–1982), Spanish football player
 House of Olaso, Basque noble family

Basque-language surnames